Trebeništa is a village in the municipality of Debarca, North Macedonia. It used to be part of the former municipality of Mešeišta.

Demographics
According to the 2002 census, the village had a total of 513 inhabitants. Ethnic groups in the village include:

Macedonians 500
Albanians 8
Turks 2
Serbs 1 
Others 2

References

Villages in Debarca Municipality